Robinson Lake may refer to:

 Robinson Lake in Cross County, Arkansas
 Robinson Lake in Miller County, Arkansas
 Robinson Lake in Jefferson County, Arkansas
 Robinson Lake in Woodruff County, Arkansas
 Robinson Lake in  Michigan
 Robinson Lake in Wabasha County, Minnesota
 Robinson Lake (Nevada)